Yoo Man-Kee (born 22 March 1988) is a South Korean footballer who plays as midfielder for Goyang Hi FC in K League Challenge.

Career
He joined Suwon FC after graduation.

He was selected by Goyang Hi FC in 2013 K League draft. He made his professional debut in the league match against FC Anyang on 17 March.

References

External links 

1988 births
Living people
Association football midfielders
South Korean footballers
Suwon FC players
Goyang Zaicro FC players
Korea National League players
K League 2 players